The Chrysanthemum and the Guillotine is a 2018 film directed by Takahisa Zeze about women's sumo wrestling and anarchism after the 1923 Great Kanto earthquake.

The film won the Busan Film Festival's Bright East Films Award while in production in 2016. The film premiered in North America during New York City's 2019 CineCina film festival.

See also 

 Girochinsha

References

Further reading

External links 

 

Films about anarchism
Women's sumo
2010s Japanese films
2010s Japanese-language films